Kirumi Bridge is a cable-stayed bridge in northern Tanzania across the Mara River on the border of Butiama and Rorya Districts of Mara Region. Its construction was financed via a loan from the African Development Fund. It was inaugurated in October 1985 by Julius Nyerere, the country's first president.

References

Cable-stayed bridges in Tanzania